Lethrinops longipinnis is a species of cichlid endemic to Lake Malawi where it is found at depths of  (usually only down to ) over sandy substrates.  This species grows to a length of  SL.

References

longipinnis
Fish of Lake Malawi
Fish of Malawi
Fish described in 1978
Taxa named by David Henry Eccles
Taxa named by Digby S. C. Lewis
Taxonomy articles created by Polbot